Sumprabum is a town in the Kachin State of the northernmost part of the Myanmar.

Climate
Sumprabum has a humid subtropical climate (Köppen climate classification Cwa), closely bordering on a subtropical highland climate (Cwb).

External links
Satellite map at Maplandia.com

Township capitals of Myanmar
Populated places in Kachin State